Jean-Baptiste Stouf (Paris 1742–Charenton-le-Pont 1826) was a French sculptor known especially for his commemorative portrait busts and expressive emotional content.

Biography
Stouf was a pupil of Guillaume II Coustou, son of the great French baroque sculptor Guillaume Coustou.  Stouf's Bust of Belisarius at the J. Paul Getty Museum shows the general of Justinian, blinded, as a beggar, in a manner that suggests a philosopher or saint. His reception piece for the Académie Royale de Peinture et de Sculpture in 1785, the Death of Abel, shows Cain's victim sprawled full-length on the ground (Louvre Museum). The Detroit Museum of Art has a terracotta sketch for a Hercules Vanquishing Two Centaurs.

External links
Louvre Museum Official Website: Jean-Baptiste Stouf: 6 sculptures
 

18th-century French sculptors
French male sculptors
19th-century French sculptors
Members of the Académie des beaux-arts
1742 births
1826 deaths
18th-century French male artists